Sébastien Wüthrich (born 29 May 1990) is a Swiss professional footballer who last played as a midfielder for Ratchaburi Mitr Phol in the Thai League 1. He is a full international for Switzerland under-21.

References

External links
 
 
 

1990 births
Living people
People from Neuchâtel
Association football midfielders
Swiss men's footballers
Switzerland youth international footballers
Switzerland under-21 international footballers
Swiss Super League players
Swiss Challenge League players
Ligue 1 players
Liga I players
Neuchâtel Xamax FCS players
FC Sion players
FC St. Gallen players
Montpellier HSC players
FC Aarau players
Servette FC players
FC Astra Giurgiu players
Sebastien Wuthrich
Swiss expatriate footballers
Swiss expatriate sportspeople in France
Expatriate footballers in France
Swiss expatriate sportspeople in Romania
Expatriate footballers in Romania
Swiss expatriate sportspeople in Thailand
Expatriate footballers in Thailand
Sportspeople from the canton of Neuchâtel